The timeline of DC Comics is split up to decades:

 Timeline of DC Comics (1930s)
 Timeline of DC Comics (1940s)
 Timeline of DC Comics (1950s)

Culture-related timelines
DC Comics
DC Comics